Rotraut Susanne Berner (born 26 August 1948, in Stuttgart) is a German graphic designer and illustrator. She illustrated The Number Devil by Hans Magnus Enzensberger.

She is well known for a series of popular children's book, called Wimmelbilderbuch, which have attained a worldwide circulation of close to 500,000 copies in fifteen countries.

Working as a freelance illustrator, she has focused on books for children and young adults, illustrating more than 80 such books and designing over 800 book covers.

For her contribution as a children's illustrator Berner was a finalist for the biennial, international Hans Christian Andersen Award in 2002, 2004, and 2014, and she won it in 2016.

References

External links

 
 
 Cornelia Rémi: Reading as Playing. The Cognitive Challenge of the Wimmelbook. In: Bettina Kümmerling-Meibauer (ed.): Emergent Literacy - Children's Books from 0 to 3. Studies in Written Language and Literacy. Bd 13. John Benjamins, Amsterdam 2011, S. 115–139,  (Pre-print, online).

1948 births
Living people
German children's book illustrators
German illustrators
German graphic designers
German women illustrators
Women graphic designers